Charlotte Heering (born 15 January 1986) is a Danish dressage rider.  She competed at the 2021 European Championships were she won a bronze team medal. Heering also competed at several European youth Championships from 2004 till 2007.

Heering was selected by the Danish Equestrian Federation as traveling reserve at the Olympic Games in Tokyo, Japan with her horse Bufranco.

References

Living people
1986 births
Danish female equestrians
Danish dressage riders